The Shire of Avoca was a local government area about  northwest of Melbourne, the state capital of Victoria, Australia.

History

Avoca was first incorporated as a road district on 6 December 1861, and became a shire on 28 December 1864. In January 1941, it lost parts of its area to the Shire of Lexton.

On 23 September 1994, the Shire of Avoca was abolished, and along with the Shires of Lexton and Ripon, was merged into the newly created Shire of Pyrenees. The district surrounding Navarre was transferred to the newly created Shire of Northern Grampians in January 1995.

Wards

The Shire of Avoca was divided into three ridings, each of which elected three councillors:
 Avoca Township Riding
 East Riding
 West Riding

Towns and localities
 Avoca*
 Barkly
 Crowlands
 Frenchmans
 Glenlofty
 Homebush
 Lamplough
 Landsborough
 Moonambel
 Natte Yallock
 Navarre
 Percydale
 Rathscar
 Rathscar West
 Redbank
 Tanwood
 Warrenmang
 Wattle Creek

* Council seat.

Population

* Estimate in the 1958 Victorian Year Book.

References

External links
 Victorian Places - Avoca and Avoca Shire

Avoca